The Fajr-e Felestin Hall is an indoor sports arena in Saveh, Iran. It is the home stadium of Futsal Super League teams Shahrdari Saveh. The facility seats 2,500 people.

References

Indoor arenas in Iran
Sport in Saveh
Buildings and structures in Markazi Province